Kush is a 2007 independent action-thriller film directed by York Shackleton, starring Nick Annunziata (HBO’s “The Sopranos”), William Atherton, Michael Bellisario, Matthew Carey, James DeBello, Lin Shaye, and James Duval. Kush is distributed by Maverick Entertainment Group.

Kush was nominated for Best Drama at the 2008 High Times Stony Awards.

Plot
A group of young drug dealers lose $30,000 to an addict and plot revenge by scheming to kidnap the addict's teenage brother.
 The plot drew comparisons to the 2006 film Alpha Dog, which based on the true story of the 2000 kidnapping and murder of Nicholas Markowitz by Jesse James Hollywood. Kush takes place in a similar location (Calabasas, California), but focuses on the drug dealer who makes a terrible mistake; the kidnapped teen is more a background character. In Kush, the sympathetic characters are Dusty, the young but polished leader of the crew who avoids trouble; and Christian, the drug dealer's son who is trying to grow up too fast.

Cast
 Bret Roberts as Dusty
 Nicole Marie Lenz as Blaise
 Mike Erwin as Christian
 Marne Patterson as Taylor
 Matthew Carey as Ryder
 James Duval as Cyrus
 Lin Shaye as Susan
 Michael Bellisario as Jared
 William Atherton as King
 Nick Annunziata as Johnny

References

External links
 
 Kush on Maverick's website
 

2007 films
American action thriller films
American independent films
2007 action thriller films
2007 independent films
2000s American films